Saturnino Calderón de la Barca y Collantes (1799–1864) was a Spanish noble and politician who served as Minister of State from 1858 to 1863, during the reign of Queen Isabella II of Spain and in a cabinet headed by Leopoldo O'Donnell, 1st Duke of Tetuan.

Biography
He was born at Reinosa, the  eldest son of Manuel Santiago Calderón de la Barca y Rodríguez-Fontecha, Senator for Cantabria, and his wife Saturnina Collantes y Fonegra. His younger brother Fernando Calderón de la Barca, 1st Marquis of Reinosa was also a prominent politician who held important offices.

Among other honours, Calderón was appointed Knight Grand Cross of the Orders of Charles III, Isabella the Catholic, Pius IX, the Légion d'honneur, the Immaculate Conception of Vila Viçosa, the Ludwigsorden, the Dannebrog, the Polar Star, the Royal Guelphic Order and Saint Januarius, and Knight Grand Cordon of the Order of Leopold of Belgium.

He died at Madrid in 1864.

Sources
Ruiz Gómez, Fernando, The Collantes Family. 
The Calderones in Spain. 
Personal dossier of D. Saturnino Calderón de la Barca. Spanish Senate

|-

1799 births
1864 deaths
People from Reinosa
Liberal Union (Spain) politicians
Foreign ministers of Spain
Grand Croix of the Légion d'honneur
Knights Grand Cross of the Order of the Immaculate Conception of Vila Viçosa
Knights of the Order of Pope Pius IX
Grand Crosses of the Order of the Dannebrog
Commanders Grand Cross of the Order of the Polar Star
Knights Grand Cross of the Order of Isabella the Catholic